The euro sign is the currency sign used for the euro, the official currency of the eurozone and unilaterally adopted by Kosovo and Montenegro. The design was presented to the public by the European Commission on 12 December 1996. It consists of a stylized letter E (or epsilon), crossed by two lines instead of one. In English, the sign immediately precedes the value (for instance, €10); in most other European languages, it follows the value, usually but not always with an intervening space (for instance, 10€, 10€).

Design

There were originally 32 proposed designs for a symbol for Europe's new common currency; the Commission short-listed these to ten candidates. These ten were put to a public survey. After the survey had narrowed the original ten proposals down to two, it was up to the Commission to choose the final design. The other designs that were considered are not available for the public to view, nor is any information regarding the designers available for public query. The Commission considers the process of designing to have been internal and keeps these records secret. The eventual winner was a design created by a team of four experts whose identities have not been revealed. It is assumed that the Belgian graphic designer Alain Billiet was the winner and thus the designer of the euro sign.

The official story of the design history of the euro sign is disputed by Arthur Eisenmenger, a former chief graphic designer for the European Economic Community, who says he had the idea 25 years before the Commission's decision.

The Commission specified a euro logo with exact proportions and colours (PMS Yellow foreground, PMS Reflex Blue background), for use in public-relations material related to the euro introduction. While the Commission intended the logo to be a prescribed glyph shape, type designers made it clear that they intended instead to adapt the design to be consistent with the typefaces to which it was to be added.

Use on computers and mobile phones
Generating the euro sign using a computer depends on the operating system and national conventions. Initially, some mobile phone companies issued an interim software update for their special SMS character set, replacing the less-frequent Japanese yen sign with the euro sign. Subsequent mobile phones have both currency signs.

The euro is represented in the Unicode character set with the character name EURO SIGN and the code position U+20AC (decimal 8364) as well as in updated versions of the traditional Latin character set encodings. In HTML, the  entity can also be used.

History of implementation
An implicit character encoding, along with the fact that the code position of the euro sign is different in historic encoding schemes (code pages), led to many initial problems displaying the euro sign consistently in computer applications, depending on access method. While displaying the euro sign was no problem as long as only one system was used (provided an up-to-date font with the proper glyph was available), mixed setups often produced errors. Initially, Apple, Microsoft and Unix systems each chose a different code point to represent a euro symbol: thus a user of one system might have seen a euro symbol whereas another would see a different symbol or nothing at all. Another was legacy software which could only handle older encodings such as pre-euro ISO 8859-1. In such situations character set conversions had to be made, often introducing conversion errors such as a question mark (?) being displayed instead of a euro sign. With widespread adoption of Unicode and UTF-8 encoding these issues rarely arise in modern computing.

Entry methods
Depending on keyboard layout and the operating system, the symbol can be entered as:

  (UK/IRL)
  (US INTL/ESP/DNK/FIN/ISL/NOR/SWE)
  (BEL/CRO/ESP/FIN/FRA/GER/ITA/GRE/POR/CZE/EST/LTU/SVK/SWE/ROS/ROP/TUR)
  (HU/PL)
  (UK/IRL)
  (US INTL/ESP)
  in Microsoft Word in United States and more layouts
 + in Microsoft Windows (depends on system locale setting)

On the macOS operating system, a variety of key combinations are used depending on the keyboard layout, for example:

  in British layout
  in United States layout
  in Slovenian layout
  in French layout
  in German, Italian, Spanish and Turkish layout
  in Swedish layout

Typewriters
Classical typewriters are still used in many parts of the world, often recycled from businesses that have adopted desktop computers. Typewriters lacking the euro sign can imitate it by typing a capital "C", backspacing, and overstriking it with the equals sign.

Use

Placement of the sign varies. Countries have generally continued the style used for their former currencies. In those countries where previous convention was to place the currency sign before the figure, the euro sign is placed in the same position (e.g., €3.50). In those countries where the amount preceded the national currency sign, the euro sign is again placed in that relative position (e.g., 3,50 €).

The European Union’s Interinstitutional Style Guide (for EU staff) states that the euro sign should be placed in front of the amount without any space in English, but after the amount in most other languages.

In English language newspapers and periodicals such as the Financial Times, The Economist and many more, the euro signlike the dollar sign ($) and the pound sign (£)is placed before the figure, unspaced, When written out, "euro" is placed after the value in lower case; the plural is used for two or more units, and euro cents are separated with a point, not a comma (e.g., €1.50, 14 euros). This convention is the reverse of that used in many other European languages.

Prices of items costing less than one euro (for example ten cents) are often written using a local abbreviation like "ct." (particularly in Spain and Lithuania), "snt." (Finland), c. (Ireland) and Λ (the capital letter lambda for Λεπτό Leptó in Greece): (for example, 10 ct., 10c., 10Λ, 10 snt. The US style "¢" or "￠" is rarely seen in formal contexts. Alternatively, they can be written as decimals e.g. 0.07 €.

See also

Notes

References

External links

 Euro name and symbol, Directorate-General for Economic and Financial Affairs of the European Commission
 Communication from the Commission: The use of the Euro symbol, July 1997, Directorate-General for Economic and Financial Affairs of the European Commission
 Typing a Euro symbol on a non-European QWERTY keyboard. Several methods are shown for and others special characters.

Currency symbols
Euro
Symbols introduced in 1996
Symbols of the European Union